[[File:Northern Missouri No-Till Soybeans in Gumbo Soil.jpg|thumb|upright|{{center|Northern Missouri "no-till" soybean crop in gumbo soil}}]]Gumbo soil''' is a mixture which often has some small amounts of sand and/or organic material, but is typically defined by the overwhelming presence of very fine particles of clay. 

Although gumbo soils are exceptional at water retention, they can be difficult to farm, as precipitation will turn gumbo into a unique muddy mess that is challenging to work using large commercial farming equipment. Avoiding tillage of this type of soil, thru no-till farming  appears strongly correlated with higher yields versus more traditional tilling practices.

References

Types of soil
Horticulture